Kern Glen Creek (also known as Meadow Brook) is a tributary of Billings Mill Brook in Wyoming County, Pennsylvania, in the United States. The creek is not designated as an impaired waterbody. The surficial geology in its vicinity mostly consists of Wisconsinan Till.

Course

Kern Glen Creek begins to the southeast of Kintner Hill in Lemon Township. It flows south for several tenths of a mile, almost immediately entering Tunkhannock Township, where it passes through one wetland and enters another. The creek goes through this wetland for a few tenths of a mile, receiving an unnamed tributary from the right before leaving the wetland at its southeastern edge. It continues flowing southeast for a few tenths of a mile, receiving an unnamed tributary from the left. After this, the creek turns east and crosses Pennsylvania Route 29 before turning southeast again. After a few tenths of a mile, it passes through a wetland with a lake and continues flowing southeast. Several tenths of a mile further downstream, it reaches its confluence with Billings Mill Brook.

Hydrology
Kern Glen Creek is not designated as an impaired waterbody.

Geography and geology

The surficial geology in virtually all of the area in the vicinity of Kern Glen Creek consists of a till known as Wisconsinan Till. However, there are a few patches of wetlands, peat bogs, and lakes in the watershed. There is also a small patch of bedrock consisting of sandstone and shale near the creek's lower reaches.

Knobs of till cause the valley of Kern Glen Creek to be a beaded valley, with broader and narrower segments.

Watershed
The stream is entirely within the United States Geological Survey quadrangle of Tunkhannock. Its mouth is located at Kern Glen.

History
Kern Glen Creek was entered into the Geographic Names Information System on August 2, 1979. Its identifier in the Geographic Names Information System is 1178398. The stream is also known as Meadow Brook. This variant name appears in Israel C. White's 1883 book The geology of the North Branch Susquehanna River Region in the six counties of Wyoming, Lackawanna, Luzerne, Columbia, Montour and Northumberland.

A $2000 bridge rehabilitation of a bridge carrying Pennsylvania Route 29 across Kern Glen Creek was authorized in the Special Session
Capital Budget Act of 1996 for Flood Damaged Highway-Railroad and Highway Bridges. Chief Gathering LLC. once applied for and/or received a permit to build and maintain a  natural gas gathering pipeline and timber mats impacting an unnamed tributary Kern Glen Creek.

See also
List of rivers of Pennsylvania

References

Rivers of Wyoming County, Pennsylvania
Tributaries of Tunkhannock Creek
Rivers of Pennsylvania